Munterconnaught is a civil and ecclesiastical parish of County Cavan in the Republic of Ireland. It is located between the southern shores of Lough Ramor and the county boundary with County Meath.

Etymology
The name Munterconnaught has often been mistaken as being derived from the Irish Muintir meaning people and Connacht being the western province. However, it actually has nothing to do with this and is named after Choncur, one of the 13 sons of the O'Reilly's of Breffni. The O'Reilly Clan ruled the area of Cavan and Leitrim which was known as Breffni for centuries.

Civil parish
Munterconnaught consists of drumlin country, lush farmland and lakeshore. It featured in Griffith's Valuation in the 1850s. 

Lewis' Topographical Dictionary in 1837 wrote of Munterconnaught

Townlands

 Ballaghdorragh, 
 Behernagh, 
 Carrick, 
 Corronagh, 
 Croaghan, 
 Crossafehin, 
 Eighter, 
 Island, 
 Knockaraheen, 
 Knockatemple, 
 Knocknagartan, 
 Knocknaveagh, 
 Lurganboy, 
 Ryefield,

Census records
Munterconnaught is one of the few locations in Ireland to have early census returns that survive. The destruction of the Public Records Office in the Four Courts in 1922 destroyed all surviving Irish census records from before the 1901 census, and most Church of Ireland records, with rare exceptions. Munterconnaught's census records from 1821 survived the inferno significantly intact along with some other parishes in Cavan.

Ecclesiastical parishes
Church of Ireland parish
Munterconnaught Parish Church, Knockatemple was built in 1831. It is one of the Church of Ireland places of worship in the Virginia Group of Parishes in the Diocese of Kilmore, Elphin and Ardagh. The other churches in the group are Lurgan Parish Church in Virginia (built 1821), Killinkere Parish Church (built 1817), and Billis Church (built 1844). The four churches were amalgamated under one incumbency in 1972.

Roman Catholic parish
The Roman Catholic Parish of Castlerahan and Munterconnaught is one of the parishes in the Diocese of Kilmore. St. Bartholomew's Church, Knockatemple (built 1847) is the Munterconnaught part of the parish, and St. Mary's Church, Castlerahan (built 1834) and St. Joseph's Church, Ballyjamesduff (built 1966) are in the Castlerahan part of the parish.

Sport
Munterconnaught's Gaelic Athletic Association club has won many championships and leagues since its re-affiliation in 1969.  The team was originally formed in 1926 but records date the playing of some form of football in Munterconnaught as early as the 1860s.

People   
Local celebrities included the singer-songwriter Austin Tighe, and actor Liam Riddley, who had a recurring role as muscles in the television series Glenroe. The journalist and political advisor Jim Duffy is of Munterconnaught descent through his mother, Bernadette Duffy (née Cadden), who was from Munterconnaught. She had been a student in Munterconnaught National School in the 1940s.

References

Further reading
 Declan Cooney (ed), Munterconnaught: a history, 1847–1997 Knocktemple History Committee (Knocktemple, Ireland) 
 List of Cavan census substitutes
 See also this link to local history research studies about Cavan, including Munterconnaught. 

Civil parishes of County Cavan